Hymenosporum is a monotypic genus in the family Pittosporaceae. The sole included species is Hymenosporum flavum, commonly known as native frangipani, which is a rainforest tree native to  New Guinea, Queensland and New South Wales. Despite its common name, it is not closely related to the frangipani, but is related to the widespread genus Pittosporum.

Description
The obovate leaves are simple, alternate, glossy green above and lighter below.

They are initially functionally male, and coloured white with lemon tinges. Over a period of about 5 days the stigma begins to develop and the stamens curl away. At the same time the colour deepens until the fully functioning female flower is golden yellow with red/purple track lines in the throat.

They are numerous, and stacked together to fill each chamber.

Phenology
Flowering occurs from early spring to early summer, and the fruit ripen around May.

Taxonomy
This species was first described in 1854 by the English botanist and illustrator William Jackson Hooker as Pittosporum flavum. In 1860 the German born Australian botanist Ferdinand von Mueller transferred it to the genus Hymenosporum in his work Fragmenta phytographiæ Australiæ.

Etymology
The genus name Hymenosporum is derived from the Ancient Greek words humḗn, meaning membrane, and sporā́, meaning seed. It is a reference to the winged seeds. The species epithet flavum is from the Latin flāvus, yellow, and refers to the flower colour.

Cultivation
Native frangipani is widely cultivated and usually grows to around 8 metres in height although it can grow to over 20 metres tall in the rainforest. It can be grown in shaded positions, but flowers best in full sun.

In Australia, the tree is commonly planted in suburban streets, in shopping boulevards and in walkways between tall buildings. It prefers a well-drained soil with a high organic content, but is highly adaptable. Very young seedlings are easily killed by frosts but if kept in a sheltered position until about 1–1.5 metres high, will thrive in cooler areas, as long as they have access to water during hot dry spells.

Hymenosporum flavum is included in the Tasmanian Fire Service's list of low flammability plants, indicating that it is suitable for growing within a building protection zone.

Gallery

References

External links
 
 
 View a map of historical sightings of this species at the Australasian Virtual Herbarium
 View observations of this species on iNaturalist
 View images of this species on Flickriver
 PlantNET-New South Wales Flora online: Hymenosporum flavum

Pittosporaceae
Apiales of Australia
Flora of New South Wales
Flora of Queensland
Flora of New Guinea
Monotypic Apiales genera
Trees of Australia
Ornamental trees
Garden plants of Australia
Garden plants
Taxa named by Ferdinand von Mueller
Taxa named by Robert Brown (botanist, born 1773)